Anne Voase Coates  (12 December 1925 – 8 May 2018) was a British film editor with a more than 60-year-long career. She was perhaps best known as the editor of David Lean's epic film Lawrence of Arabia in 1962, for which she won an Oscar. Coates was nominated five times for the Academy Award for Best Film Editing for the films Lawrence of Arabia, Becket (1963), The Elephant Man (1980), In the Line of Fire (1993) and Out of Sight (1998). In an industry where women accounted for only 16 percent of all editors working on the top 250 films of 2004, and 80 percent of the films had absolutely no women on their editing teams at all, Coates thrived as a top film editor. She was awarded BAFTA's highest honour, a BAFTA Fellowship, in February 2007 and was given an Academy Honorary Award, which are popularly known as a Lifetime Achievement Oscar, in November 2016 by the Academy of Motion Picture Arts and Sciences.

Early life and education 
Coates was born in Reigate, Surrey, England, the daughter of Kathleen Voase (née Rank) and Major Laurence Calvert Coates. Her first passion was horses. As a girl, she thought she might become a race-horse trainer.

Coates attended the Reigate village school called the Micklefield School. She then attended High Trees School in Horley (Surrey). She graduated from Bartrum Gables in Broadstairs (Kent).

Before becoming a film editor, she worked as a nurse at Sir Archibald McIndoe's pioneering plastic surgery hospital in East Grinstead, England.

Career 
Coates became interested in cinema after seeing Wuthering Heights (1939) directed by William Wyler. She decided to pursue film directing and started working as an assistant at a production company specializing in religious films (also doing projectionist and sound recording work). There she fixed film prints of religious short films before sending them to various British church tours. This splicing work eventually led to the rare job as an assistant film editor at Pinewood Studios, where she worked on various films. Her first experience was assisting for film editor Reggie Mills. 

Coates later worked with film director David Lean on Lawrence of Arabia. She had a long and varied career, and continued to edit films, including Out of Sight and Erin Brockovich (both for Steven Soderbergh). Coates was a member of both the Guild of British Film and Television Editors (GBFTE) and American Cinema Editors (ACE).

Varietys Eileen Kowalski noted "many of the editorial greats have been women: Margaret Booth, Dede Allen, Verna Fields, Thelma Schoonmaker, Anne V. Coates and Dorothy Spencer."

Personal life 
Coates was at the centre of a film industry family. Besides being the niece of J. Arthur Rank, she was married to the director Douglas Hickox for many years. Her brother, John Coates, was a producer (The Snowman and Yellow Submarine). Her sons, Anthony Hickox (b. 1959) and James Hickox (b. 1965) were film directors. Her daughter Emma E. Hickox (b. 1964) is a film editor.

Death 
Coates died on 8 May 2018, aged 92, at the Motion Picture Country Home and Hospital, Woodland Hills, Los Angeles, California.

Quotes

 "In a way, I've never looked at myself as a woman in the business. I've just looked at myself as an editor. I mean, I'm sure I've been turned down because I'm a woman, but then other times I've been used because they wanted a woman editor."
 "...I guess I've been lucky that most of the time I've been in the same direction as the director. I try to work with directors whose work I like and find interesting. When I was younger, I had to find work where I could, and I had some not great experiences with directors."
 "You have the courage of your convictions. When you're editing you have to make thousands of decisions every day and if you dither over them all the time, you'll never get anything done."
 "I seem to get the rhythm from the performances. I like to feel I'm very much an actor's editor. I look very much to the performances and cut very much for performances rather than the action. I think that's important, what's in the eyes of the actor."

Selected filmography

 1947: The End of the River – second editor (uncredited)
 1949: The History of Mr. Polly – assistant editor (uncredited)
 1952: The Pickwick Papers
 1953: Grand National Night
 1954: Forbidden Cargo
 1955: To Paris with Love
 1956: Lost
 1957: The Truth About Women
 1958: The Horse's Mouth
 1960: Tunes of Glory
 1961: Don't Bother to Knock
 1962: Lawrence of Arabia
 1964: Becket
 1965: Young Cassidy
 1965: Those Magnificent Men in Their Flying Machines
 1966: Hotel Paradiso
 1968: Great Catherine
 1970: The Adventurers
 1971: Friends
 1972: Follow Me!
 1972: A War of Children
 1973: Bequest to the Nation
 1973: Catholics
 1974: 11 Harrowhouse
 1974: Murder on the Orient Express
 1975: Man Friday
 1976: Aces High
 1976: The Eagle Has Landed
 1978: The Legacy
 1980: The Elephant Man
 1981: The Bushido Blade – supervising editor with Yoshitami Kuroiwa
 1981: Ragtime
 1983: The Pirates of Penzance
 1984: Greystoke: The Legend of Tarzan, Lord of the Apes
 1986: Lady Jane
 1986: Raw Deal
 1987: Masters of the Universe
 1989: Lawrence of Arabia – editorial consultant 1989 reconstruction and restoration of 1962 film
 1989: Farewell to the King
 1989: Listen to Me
 1990: I Love You to Death
 1991: What About Bob?
 1992: Chaplin
 1993: In the Line of Fire
 1994: Pontiac Moon
 1995: Congo
 1996: Striptease
 1997: Out to Sea
 1998: Out of Sight
 2000: Erin Brockovich
 2000: Passion of Mind
 2001: Sweet November
 2002: Unfaithful
 2004: Taking Lives
 2006: Catch and Release
 2007: The Golden Compass
 2010: Extraordinary Measures
 2015: Fifty Shades of Grey

Academy Awards 

 1963: Academy Awards, Academy Award for Best Film Editing for Lawrence of Arabia
 1965: Academy Awards, Academy Award for Best Film Editing (nominee) for Becket
 1981: Academy Awards, Academy Award for Best Film Editing (nominee) for The Elephant Man
 1994: Academy Awards, Academy Award for Best Film Editing (nominee) for In the Line of Fire
 1999: Academy Awards, Academy Award for Best Film Editing (nominee) for Out of Sight
 2017: Academy Awards, Academy Honorary Award aka Lifetime Achievement Award

BAFTA awards 
 1975: BAFTA Awards, BAFTA Award for Best Editing (nominee) for Murder on the Orient Express
 1981: BAFTA Awards, BAFTA Award for Best Editing (nominee) for The Elephant Man
 1993: BAFTA Awards, BAFTA Award for Best Editing (nominee) for In the Line of Fire
 2001: BAFTA Awards, BAFTA Award for Best Editing (nominee) for Erin Brockovich 
 2007: BAFTA Fellowship

Other honors
 1963: American Cinema Editors, ACE Eddie for Best Edited Feature Film (nominee) for Lawrence of Arabia
 1965: American Cinema Editors, ACE Eddie for Best Edited Feature Film (nominee) for Becket
 1994: American Cinema Editors, ACE Eddie for Best Edited Feature Film (nominee) for In the Line of Fire
 1995: American Cinema Editors, Career Achievement Award
 1997: Women in Film Crystal Award, International Award
 1998: American Cinema Editors, ACE Eddie for Best Edited Feature Film (nominee) for Out of Sight
 1999: Online Film Critics Society Award, Best Film Editing (nominee) for Out of Sight
 2012: Motion Picture Editors Guild, best edited films of all time for Lawrence of Arabia (1962) and Out of Sight (1998)

References

External links
 
 
  Anne V. Coates credits – AMCTV.com Biography
   Anne Coates interviewed by Walter Murch in 2000
  Anne V. Coates – Filmography New York Times
 Anne V. Coates on Women Film Editors

1925 births
2018 deaths
Academy Honorary Award recipients
American Cinema Editors
English film editors
Best Film Editing Academy Award winners
People from Reigate
BAFTA fellows
Officers of the Order of the British Empire
British women film editors